The Bulletin de l'Institut Français d'Archéologie Orientale or BIFAO is a scientific journal containing scholarly articles pertaining to the study of Egyptology. Articles cover a range of disciplines, including history, art history, archaeology, philology and religion, from the Prehistoric period to the end of the Byzantine Period in Egypt. Although primarily a French publication, articles written in English and German are also accepted.

It has been published annually in Cairo since 1901 by the Institut Français d'Archéologie Orientale. This makes it one of the oldest Egyptological journals.

The institute's official website provides an online index of articles from the Bulletin and open access to every article from Vol. 1 (1901) to present.  In recent years, the Bulletin has displayed a different picture on the cover of each issue.

References

External links 
 BIFAO article index (Archived version) (online articles & article title listings)
 Official website of BIFAO
 Official website of the Institut Français d'Archéologie Orientale
 Picture of cover of Vol.98 (1998), with indexes of issues from 1998 to 2000.

Publications established in 1901
Egyptology journals
French-language journals
Multilingual journals